Midway is an unincorporated community in Marion County, Arkansas, United States.

References

Unincorporated communities in Marion County, Arkansas
Unincorporated communities in Arkansas